Blackburn Lake Sanctuary is an example of regenerated and remnant bushland in suburban Melbourne, Australia. It is located in the suburb of Blackburn. It is the most significant of the many parks in the City of Whitehorse, featuring areas of regenerated bushland and various walking tracks.

In 1889 the Kooyongkoot Creek was dammed forming Blackburn Lake, at the centre of the sanctuary. The park has a diverse history revolving around the human usage of the lake and surrounding bushland, which by the 1960s left the lake in particular, very polluted. Although still polluted today, the late 20th century saw much regenerative planting and protection measures by local residents and community groups which has halted and in some places reduced pollution. Today, the park is home to a variety of local wildlife, including Pacific black ducks and herons. The sanctuary also features a variety of other birds, as well as possums and sugar gliders.

History
In 1889 the lake itself was formed when Gardiners Creek was dammed to provide water for local fruit growers. The lake grew in popularity as a tourist destination, with visitors from Melbourne travelling two hours by steam train to reach it. During the 1890s, artist Frederick McCubbin of the famed Heidelberg School lived briefly near the lake, where he painted works including "Down on His Luck", "The Bush Burial" and "Bush Idyll".

In 1909 the Adult Deaf Society purchased the land surrounding the lake, where they established a hospice and a flower farm. In 1964 the Society sold the lake and the land around it to the Melbourne Water board, and in 1965 the area was declared a sanctuary. Later public purchases increased the size of the sanctuary until it reached its current size in 1992. The Visitor Centre was refurbished in 1991 to accommodate an expanded education programme.

Much of the history of the park revolves around the damming of Kooyongkoot Creek and its use over time. See below for history of Blackburn Lake.

Geography

Blackburn Lake
In the early days before the lake was formed, Kooyongkoot Creek wound its way down the valley from Mitcham to Blackburn on its way to the Yarra River. It would have been joined along the way, particularly in winter, by many little rivulets and streams; some of these gullies can still be seen as you walk around the lake today. In summer, the creek is suspected to have dried up at times.

The lake was dammed in 1889 initially to provide water for local fruit growers, but was later used and misused for various reasons and activities until the late 1970s. Today, activities on the lake are limited to protect the surrounding environment. The lake is fed by a number of small creeks to its east and many small surrounding gullies. The dam wall is located in lake's west reaches, Lake Road runs along the top of this wall. Kooyongkoot Creek heads west from the wall, through the beginnings of its course to the Yarra River.

In the 1920s, diving towers were erected and swimming lessons were held at the lake, the water quality was as yet unaffected by surrounding land clearing, agriculture and development. The Blackburn Swimming Club was forced to close in 1931 due to vandalism of the facilities.

During the 1950s and 1960s, the lake became a dumping ground for rubbish, and there are supposed to be old car bodies and other rubbish at the bottom. These would have leached acids, lead and hydrocarbons into the water over the years. Pollution in the lake renders it unusable as a source of water for the surrounding human population or agriculture. In 1962 the dam wall in Lake Rd was built by the MMBW to form a retarding basin to prevent flooding further down Kooyongkoot Creek, and the Lake Rd Bridge was demolished in 1965.

The bridges that cross the lake and its creeks and gullies include:
Friends Bridge (early 1900s, rebuilt 1981)
Billabong Bridge (built 1980s)
Lake Road Bridge (built 1888, demolished 1965, rebuilt 2002)

Recreation

Throughout the park's history, much of the recreation in the park revolved around the lake, however today recreation revolves around the appreciation of the Australian native flora, much of which has been regenerated over time. The park is popular with bushwalkers. Cycling is also popular but is usually only partaken locally as the park does not host a cycling through-route trail.

Access information
Central Road
Gwenda Avenue (Main entrance and carpark)
Fulview Court
Cromwell Court

Lake Road
Jeffery Street
Naughton Grove (dam wall)
Halley Street (dam wall)
Ottawa Avenue

Clifton Street
Via Playground

References

External links
Blackburn Lake Sanctuary Advisory Committee site
Archive of previous Blackburn Lake Sanctuary Advisory Committee site

Parks in Melbourne
Wildlife sanctuaries of Australia
Lakes of Melbourne
City of Whitehorse